Warning: Parental Advisory is a 2002 television film created by VH1 and directed by Mark Waters. The film follows the story of Dee Snider, John Denver, and Frank Zappa, testifying before Congress against lyrics labeling laws.

The film focuses on the formation of the Parents Music Resource Center and its impact on music during 1985. It stars Jason Priestley, Mariel Hemingway as Tipper Gore, Griffin Dunne as Zappa, and Dee Snider as himself. The introductory speech that Snider gave in the film before testifying is the same speech he gave in 1985.

Cast
 Griffin Dunne as Frank Zappa
 Dee Snider as himself
 Jason Priestley as Charlie Burner
 Mariel Hemingway as Tipper Gore
 Tim Guinee as John Denver
 Deborah Yates as Pamela Stone
 Deborah Jolly as Shirley
 Lois Chiles as Susan Baker
 Lee Burns as Andrew Norris
 John S. Davies as Dave Gorman
 Jim Beatty as Al Gore
 Richard Dillard as Senator Sam
 Gail Cronauer as Senator Paula Hawkins
 Joe Berryman as Donald Bean
 David Born as James Baker
 Dina Waters as The Receptionist
 Tom Prior as Senator Sam's Aide
 Alex Harder as Pizza Guy
 Anthony Marble as Record Store Clerk
 William Caploe as Dom
 Michael Crabtree as Senator Danforth
 Eleese Lester as PMRC Receptionist
 Tony Richards as Press Club Reporter
 Cherry Petty as Curtis's Assistant
 Dwight Adair as Frank Zappa's Manager

See also
Parental Advisory

References

External links 
 

2002 television films
2002 films
American television films
Films about music and musicians
American films based on actual events
Films directed by Mark Waters
Films shot in Houston
Films set in 1985
VH1 films
2000s English-language films